Świercze is a village in Pułtusk County, Masovian Voivodeship, in east-central Poland. It is the seat of the gmina (administrative district) called Gmina Świercze.

Swiercze has a train station on the route from Warsaw to North Poland. The village has several shops, a post office and bank, and a school. The village has a police station. 

The sewage system in the village has recently been upgraded thanks to EU funding  

It takes around 1 hour to get from the village to central Warsaw on the train.

References

Villages in Pułtusk County